Kapa is a fabric made by native Hawaiians from the bast fibres of certain species of trees and shrubs in the orders Rosales and Malvales.

Description and uses

Kapa is based primarily on the creative combination of linear elements that cross and converge to form squares, triangles, chevrons, and diagonal forms, giving a feeling of boldness and directness. Kapa was used primarily for clothing like the malo worn by men as a loincloth and the pāū worn by women as a wraparound. Other uses for kapa depended on caste and a person's place in ancient Hawaiian society.

Kapa moe (bed covers) were reserved for the alii or chiefly caste, while kapa robes were used by kāhuna or priestly caste. Kapa was also used as banners where leis were hung from it and images of their gods were printed on it.

Techniques
Cultural anthropologists over the course of the 20th century identified techniques in the creation of kapa that are unique to the Hawaiian Islands. Wauke (Broussonetia papyrifera) was the preferred source of bast fibres for kapa, but it was also made from ulu (Artocarpus altilis), ōpuhe (Urera spp.), maaloa (Neraudia melastomifolia), māmaki (Pipturus albidus), ākala (Rubus hawaiensis), ākalakala (R. macraei), and hau (Hibiscus tiliaceus). In the 18th century, pieces of kapa were often made of grooving or ribbing. It is done by pushing the dampened cloth into the grooves of a special board. The wauke tree is cut and soaked in water.  It is then laid on a kua kūkū (polished stone tablet) and beaten with a hōhoa (rounded beater).  After the first phase of beating, the kapa is transferred to a sacred house to be beaten a second time, but in a religious manner.

Process
Each kapa manufacturer used an ie kūkū, a beater with four flat sides that were each carved differently. Another way to carve the kapa is by starting on the four-sided affairs, with the coarsest grooves on one side used first in breaking down the bast, or wet bark. Then, the beating continued using two sides with finer grooves. Lastly, finishing touches were accomplished with the remaining smooth side of the beater. The carvings left an impression in the cloth that was hers alone.  After the European discovery of the Hawaiian Islands, Western traders travelled to Hawaii especially for kapa.

The process of making kapa was done primarily by women. Young girls would learn by helping their mothers, over time doing the majority of the work, and when older could make kapa by themselves.

See also
 Tapa cloth, similar fabric made elsewhere in Polynesia

References

Further reading
 Arkinstall, Patricia Lorraine (1966). A study of bark cloth from Hawaii, Samoa, Tonga and Fiji: an exploration of the regional development of distinctive styles of bark cloth and its relationship to other cultural factors. Ithaca, N.Y.: Cornell University.
 Brigham, William Tufts (1911). Ka hana kapa, the making of bark cloth in Hawaii. Honolulu, Hawaii: Bishop Museum Press.
 Kaeppler, Adrienne Lois (1975). The Fabrics of Hawaii (Bark Cloth). Leigh-on-Sea, England: F. Lewis. .

External links

 Cook-Foster Collection at Georg-August University in Göttingen, Germany
 Kapa Connection
 Hawaiian Kapa Making
 Hawaiian Kapa History
 Contemporary Hawaiian Kapa
 "Kapa: Fabric of a Culture" Article about the art of kapa making and kapa master Pua Van Dorpe by Rita Goldman. Maui No Ka 'Oi Magazine Vol.12, No.1 (January 2008)
 "Kapa: More to Learn" Pua Van Dorpe's kapa collection honoring 11 Maui chiefs. Maui No Ka 'Oi Magazine Vol.12, No.1 (January 2008)

Hawaiiana
Nonwoven fabrics
History of Oceanian clothing
Textile arts of Hawaii
Fiber plants